Takestan-e Sadrabad (also Romanized as Tākestān-e Şadrābād) is a village in Zarqan Rural District, Zarqan District, Shiraz County, Fars Province, Iran. At the 2006 census, its population was 128, in 32 families.

References 

Populated places in Zarqan County